Young & Hungry is an American romantic sitcom created by David Holden. The multi-camera series stars Emily Osment, Jonathan Sadowski, Aimee Carrero, Kym Whitley and Rex Lee, and premiered on ABC Family (now Freeform) on June 25, 2014. On March 7, 2016, Freeform renewed the series for a fourth season, which premiered on June 1, 2016, and concluded on August 3, 2016. On October 24, 2016, Osment announced via Twitter that Young & Hungry was renewed for a fifth season.

On March 15, 2018, it is officially announced that the fifth season will be the last. The final ten episodes premieres on June 20, 2018, and concludes on July 25, 2018. A series finale movie is initially announced with the cancellation, but is scrapped on August 24, 2018.

Plot
Set in San Francisco, wealthy tech entrepreneur Josh Kaminski hires Gabi Diamond as his personal chef. The two have a one-night stand after having a bit of trouble on Gabi's trial dinner. The series follows the two and their lives. The dynamic follows the couple's relationship and love life. Gabi faces challenges both in and outside of the kitchen.

Gabi lives in an apartment with her best friend, Sofia. Sofia (AKA 'lil SoSo). They constantly get into crazy antics thanks to Gabi's elaborate plans.

Cast and characters

Main
 Emily Osment as Gabi Diamond, a young chef from Florida who lives in San Francisco. She is named after and inspired by San Francisco food blogger Gabi Moskowitz. Osment describes her character as "a fun, ditzy, energetic blonde, but she also makes sure to put herself first. Sometimes she gets a little wrapped up in what’s going on with her relationship with Josh, but she always goes back to what’s most important for her."
 Jonathan Sadowski as Josh Kaminski, a young nerdy tech entrepreneur and self-made millionaire
 Aimee Carrero as Sofia Rodriguez, Gabi's best friend and roommate. She is a strong-minded and career-driven young woman with a degree from University of Florida.
 Kym Whitley as Yolanda, Josh's housekeeper
 Rex Lee as Elliot Park, Josh's publicist and right-hand-man. He is an openly gay Korean-American.

Recurring

 Mallory Jansen as Caroline Penelope Huntington (season 1), Josh's girlfriend turned fiancée
 Jesse McCartney as Cooper Finley (season 1–2), a nerdy computer hacker that Josh hires to work for him
 Bryan Safi as Alan (season 2–5), Elliot's lover and later husband
 Chris Smith as Nick Walker (season 5), a cocky immigration lawyer who becomes Sofia's boyfriend

Guest stars
Ashley Tisdale as Logan Rawlings, who publishes a "30 under 30" list for a popular magazine. When she appears to be attracted to Gabi, Elliott sets them up to go on a date in the hope of securing Josh a spot on her list. She heads a media company called Click'd in season 4 and hires Sofia as her assistant.
Kylie Minogue as Shauna, a tech reporter for ABC News with whom Josh has a fling in the episodes of season 2 entitled "Young & Moving" & "Young & Ferris Wheel". Shauna has a seven-year-old son named Brett, and an estranged adult daughter, Danielle, but when Gabi reunites Shauna with Danielle, they realize that Josh has had trysts with both of them.
Keegan Allen as Tyler, a drummer Sofia pressures Gabi to date to deal with working for Josh again. A double date with Josh and woman from Gabi and Sofia's building reveals Tyler is actually homeless.
Cheryl Hines as Kathy Kaminski, Josh's mother who has a drinking problem
Jerry O'Connell as Nick Diamond, Gabi's father who becomes romantically involved with Josh's mother, Kathy, much to the shock of Gabi and Josh
 Briana Lane as Dr. Jessica Rounds (season 3), Josh's therapist, who falls for Josh when he helps take her injured dog to the animal hospital
 Demi Mills as Keisha (season 4), Elliot and Alan's 13-year-old foster child
Heather Dubrow as Natasha Cook-Campbell, a celebrity chef and lifestyle guru who is one of Gabi's idols
Betty White as Ms. Wilson, Gabi's downstairs apartment neighbor, who gives her romantic advice. Ms. Wilson reunites with an old lover Bernie (Carl Reiner), in the episode "Young & Vegas Baby", Bernie and it's revealed in that episode that her first name is Bernice.
 Andy Buckley as Matt Danon, Josh's estranged father
 Jose Moreno Brooks as Juan Carlos (season 5), a guy in Mexico who charms Sofia

Celebrity chef and television personalities have also appeared in the show as themselves including Michael Voltaggio, Rachael Ray, Giada de Laurentiis, and Alex Guarnaschelli.

Development and production
The show is inspired by San Francisco food blogger Gabi Moskowitz. On August 23, 2013, ABC Family placed a pilot order. The pilot was written by David Holden and directed by Andy Cadiff. Ashley Tisdale, Eric Tannenbaum, Kim Tannenbaum, and Jessica Rhoades serve as executive producers.

Filming for the pilot started on April 21, 2014. On January 6, 2014, ABC Family placed a series order on Young & Hungry, with the premiere on June 25, 2014, alongside the comedy Mystery Girls. On September 29, 2014 the network renewed Young & Hungry for a second season. On June 24, 2014 the first webisode was released with Gabi Moskowitz starring.

Book
On April 11, 2017 a book titled "Young & Hungry: Your Complete Guide to a Delicious Life" was published.

Casting
Casting announcements began in September 2013, with Emily Osment first cast in the lead role of Gabi Diamond, a blunt and klutzy food blogger who
not only has a true gift for cooking, but also the ability to figure out what it is people want to eat. Aimee Carrero was the next actor cast in the series regular role of Sofia Rodriguez, Gabi's best friend and an ambitious banking intern. Shortly after, Jonathan Sadowski and Rex Lee were cast in the series, with Sadowski playing the lead role of Josh Kaminski, a young tech entrepreneur who hires Gabi as his personal chef; and Lee cast as Elliot Park, Josh's high-strung personal aide and right-hand-man. Kym Whitley was the last actor cast in the series regular role of Yolanda, Josh's housekeeper. MTV announced Australian singer Kylie Minogue as a guest star in the second season as a potential new love interest for Josh.

Series overview

Broadcast 
In Australia, the series premiered on July 25, 2015 on FOX8. In Turkey, the series airs on Dizimax Drama. In the Netherlands the series started on August 21, 2016 on Comedy Central. In the United Kingdom, the show started airing on November 14, 2016 on E4. In India, the first two seasons of the show aired in 2016 on Zee Café.

Reception

Critical response
Young & Hungry has received mixed reviews from critics. On Rotten Tomatoes the first season holds a rating of 43%, based on 7 reviews, with an average rating of 4.9/10. On Metacritic, the first season has a score of 48 out of 100, based on 5 critics, indicating "mixed or average reviews".

In a double review with fellow ABC Family series, Mystery Girls, Mary McNamara of the LA Times gave Young & Hungry a mixed review. Whilst praising the comedic skills of Osment, McNamara opined "Young & Hungry feels much more Disney Channel than ABC Family" and criticized the pilot as "overwrought". McNamara finished with hope that if the series "settled down", it would "give Osment the successful starring role she deserves".

Ratings
The first season ended with a 0.4 rating in the 18–49 demographic with 900,000 total viewers.

Accolades

Spin-off
During April 2016, it was confirmed that Young & Hungry would possibly spawn a spin-off series titled Young & Sofia centered on Gabi's best friend, Sofia Rodriguez. In May 2016, cast details surfaced with Aimee Carrero starring as Sofia Rodriguez; Ashley Tisdale as Logan Rawlings, Sofia's overbearing boss at Click'd Media; Steve Talley as Kendrick; and Ryan Pinkston as Leo. The spin-off was introduced in the eighth episode of season four, but ultimately was not picked up.

References

External links
 
 

2010s American LGBT-related comedy television series
2010s American romantic comedy television series
2010s American sitcoms
2010s LGBT-related sitcoms
2014 American television series debuts
2018 American television series endings
ABC Family original programming
American LGBT-related sitcoms
English-language television shows
Fictional LGBT couples
Freeform (TV channel) original programming
Television series by CBS Studios
Television series by Disney–ABC Domestic Television
Television shows set in San Francisco